The Intel Socket P (mPGA478MN) is the mobile processor socket replacement for Core microarchitecture chips such as Core 2 Duo. It launched on May 9, 2007, as part of the Santa Rosa platform with the Merom and Penryn processors.

Technical specifications

The front-side bus (FSB) of CPUs that install in Socket P can run at 400, 533, 667, 800, or 1066 MT/s. By adapting the multiplier the frequency of the CPU can throttle up or down to save power, given that all Socket P CPUs support EIST, except for Celeron that do not support EIST. Socket P has 478 pins, but is not electrically pin-compatible with Socket M or Socket 478. Socket P is also known as a 478-pin Micro FCPGA or μFCPGA-478. On the plastic grid is printed mPGA478MN.

See also
 List of Intel microprocessors
 Micro-FCBGA

External links
https://web.archive.org/web/20060714182555/http://dailytech.com/article.aspx?newsid=2835
https://web.archive.org/web/20060709190425/http://www.dailytech.com/article.aspx?newsid=3180
http://www.anandtech.com/cpuchipsets/showdoc.aspx?i=2808&p=4

References

Intel CPU sockets